The Clemens House in Huntsville, Alabama was built in 1835.  It was listed on the National Register of Historic Places in 1974.  The house was originally located at the southeast corner of Clinton Avenue and Church Street, but was moved to the southeast corner of Pratt Avenue and Meridian Street in 2004.

References

Houses completed in 1835
National Register of Historic Places in Huntsville, Alabama
Houses in Huntsville, Alabama
Relocated buildings and structures in Alabama